Ori Judd Kowarsky (born  September 2, 1970) is a Vancouver, British Columbia lawyer and filmmaker. His 2002 film, Various Positions, won the Prix de Montréal at the 2002 Montreal World Film Festival.

External links
 

Film directors from Vancouver
1970 births
Living people